A food truck, mobile kitchen, mobile canteen, roach coach, gut truck, catering truck, or (in Austin, Texas) food trailer, is a mobile venue that transports and sells food.  Some, including ice cream trucks, sell frozen or prepackaged food; others resemble restaurants on wheels.  Some may cater to specific meals, such as the breakfast truck, lunch truck or lunch wagon, snack truck, kebab trailer (UK), break truck, or taco truck. This list includes notable food trucks companies, and is not a comprehensive list of all food trucks companies.

Notable food trucks

 Big Gay Ice Cream Truck – New York City
 Bud the Spud - Halifax, Nova Scotia, Canada
 Burger Theory - Adelaide, South Australia
 Chef Jeremiah – Miami, Florida
 Chi'Lantro BBQ – Texas (Austin, Fort Hood, Houston)
 Clover Food Lab – Boston, Massachusetts
 Coolhaus – Southern California, New York City, and Dallas
 Don Chow Tacos – Los Angeles, California
 Grease Trucks –  Rutgers University in New Brunswick, New Jersey.
 The Grilled Cheese Truck – southwest United States
 The Habit Burger Grill – as of November 2017, has a fleet of nine food trucks
 The Halal Guys – New York City
 Holy Trinity Barbecue – Portland, Oregon
 Jojo – Portland, Oregon
 Kelvin Natural Slush Co. – New York, New York
 Kim Jong Grillin' – Portland, Oregon
 KIND Movement – tours the United States
 Kogi Korean BBQ – Los Angeles, California
 Korilla BBQ – New York City
 Maximus/Minimus – Seattle, Washington
 Off the Rez, Seattle
 Papalaya – Mayagüez, Puerto Rico
 Pincho Man – Miami, Florida
 Pølsevogn - Literally meaning "sausage wagon", these food trucks are endemic to Denmark and are a staple in most towns.
 Rancho Bravo Tacos
 Taco Bus – Tampa, Florida

Organizations
 Off the Grid
Roaming Hunger
 New York Food Truck Association
 Philadelphia Mobile Food Association
 Taco Trucks At Every Mosque - United States initiative to bring together Muslim and Latino communities

Styles
 Ice cream van
 Pølsevogn / sausage wagon

See also

 Dickie Dee – a fleet of Canadian ice cream vending carts
 Field kitchen
 Food cart
 Food Truckin'
 Food truck rally
 Hot dog cart
 Hot dog stand
 List of The Great Food Truck Race episodes
 Mobile catering
 Street food
 List of street foods
 The Great Food Truck Race

References

External links
 

 
Lists of companies by industry
Truck-related lists
Trucks